is a Japanese actress and singer. Beginning in the entertainment industry as a child actor in television commercials, she appeared in her first voice acting role in the anime television series Angel Tales (2001).

In 2006, she became known for her role as Haruhi Suzumiya in the Haruhi Suzumiya franchise, winning the Voice Acting Award at the 2007 Tokyo Anime Awards, the Best Newcomer Award at the 1st Seiyu Awards in 2007, and the Best Lead Actress award at the 2nd Seiyu Awards in 2008. In addition, she also provided the voice of Misa Amane in Death Note, Konata Izumi in Lucky Star, and Lucy Heartfilia in Fairy Tail. In 2010, Hirano began transitioning her acting career to television and stage plays, starring in Konna no Idol Janain!? (2012) and Muse no Kagami (2012).

Along with voice acting, Hirano currently releases music through Universal Sigma. She released her first single "Breakthrough" in 2006, and she released her first album Riot Girl in 2008.

Early life
Hirano was born in Nagoya on October 8, 1987. She spent a few of her very early years of life in the United States before returning to Japan.

Career

Acting career
In 1998, Hirano joined the Tokyo Child Theatrical Group division of the  company. After starting her acting career, Hirano began to appear in commercials and received her first role as a voice actress at 14 years old in the 2001 anime series Angel Tales. In 2002, when she was 15, she voiced co-lead character Lumiere in Kiddy Grade.

After graduating from high school, Hirano began seriously pursuing her voice acting and solo singing career. Her big break came in 2006, when she was cast as the voice of Haruhi Suzumiya, the title character and heroine of the anime series The Melancholy of Haruhi Suzumiya. The series' public success boosted her popularity and career in Japan. Hirano soon became one of the first voice actors who crossed over into mainstream media, as well as one of the first well-known idol voice actors. This success was followed by her voicing Reira Serizawa in Nana and Misa Amane in Death Note. At the first Seiyu Awards, she won "Best Newcomer (female)", for her role as Haruhi Suzumiya; the same role also won her a nomination as "Best Main Character (female)". At the same awards, she was also nominated for "Best Supporting Character (female)", and earned two nominations for "Best Single" (one of which was for a solo, "Bōken Desho Desho?"; the other was a group nomination for the single "Hare Hare Yukai"). She also won in the Voice Acting category at the 2007 Tokyo Anime Awards for her role as the lead character in The Melancholy of Haruhi Suzumiya.

Hirano performed at the Animelo Summer Live concerts between 2006 and 2008, as well as the Suzumiya Haruhi no Gekisō concert on March 18, 2007. She was a guest at Anime Expo 2007, along with other cast members from The Melancholy of Haruhi Suzumiya, Minori Chihara and Yūko Gotō. In 2007, she continued to enjoy great success in her career, landing the role of Konata Izumi in the anime version of Lucky Star. In 2008, at the second Seiyu Awards, she won for Best Lead Actress, and also for Best Singing along with cast members of Lucky Star for the series' opening theme "Motteke! Sailor Fuku".

In April 2011, Hirano announced that she had been prohibited from taking on new voice acting roles since the previous year. She still continued voicing characters for anime that received additional seasons or extended runs. Citing a need for a new agency that was more ideal for her career wishes, she announced on August 12, 2011, that she had left Space Craft Entertainment. On August 21, Hirano moved to the voice acting agency Grick. Days later, on August 27, she posted a message on her Twitter account, confirming that she had resumed new voice acting roles in anime.

In 2016, after a stint in the musical The Mystery of Edwin Drood in Tokyo, Hirano spent four months studying English and voice in New York.

Music career
Hirano's music career began as part of the band SpringS, which was active from 2002 to 2003.

Hirano's first solo single under the record label Lantis was "Breakthrough", which was released on March 8, 2006; the title track was used as the opening theme of the visual novel Finalist. The CD sold out in Japan the very day it was released. Her third single  was released on September 6, 2006.

Hirano released her fourth single "Love Gun" on October 10, 2007. This was followed by her fifth single "Neophilia" which was released on November 7, 2007, and her sixth single "MonStAR" which was released on December 5, 2007.

Hirano released her seventh single "Unnamed World" on April 23, 2008; the title track was used as the ending theme to the anime series Nijū Mensō no Musume. This was followed by the release of her first solo album Riot Girl on July 16, 2008. She then released the song  on October 8, 2008, which was used as the ending theme to the anime series Hyakko.

Hirano released her eighth single "Set me free / Sing a song!" on April 29, 2009. She then released her ninth single "Super Driver" on July 22, 2009; the title track is used as the opening theme of the second season of The Melancholy of Haruhi Suzumiya. Her second album  was released on November 18, 2009. Her tenth single "Hysteric Barbie" was released on June 23, 2010. To promote the single, she created a Twitter account which was originally intended to be only used for one day; however, she would continue to use the account after the promotion had ended.

In May 2011, Hirano released a compilation album titled Aya Museum. Later that month, she announced via Twitter that she was no longer performing music for Lantis and had discontinued her music career until further notice. On August 2, 2011, Japanese magazine Bubka confirmed that she was dismissed by Lantis due to a sex scandal involving her sleeping with several band members. She then returned to music in 2012 and was signed to the record label Universal Sigma. Her first release on the label was the mini album Fragments on May 23, 2012. This was followed by the song  which was released on August 15, 2012; the title track is used as the ending theme to the anime film Fairy Tail the Movie: Phoenix Priestess.

In 2013, Hirano released two singles: "TOxxxIC" which was released on February 20, and "Promise" which was released on October 9; "Promise" was used as an insert song in the documentary film Kitakitsune Monogatari: Ashita e. She released her fourth album Vivid on February 19, 2014.

In 2018, Hirano performed the song "Pride", which was used as a character song to the mobile game Granblue Fantasy.

Personal life

In November 2010, Hirano posted a message on her Twitter account that she has had a pituitary gland tumor since junior high school. While not malignant, the tumor exerts pressure on certain motor functions, resulting in temporary memory loss, loss of vision and slurring of speech. She decided against elective surgery because the surgery would alter her nasal cavity and permanently modify her voice.

Public image

Once The Melancholy of Haruhi Suzumiya broadcast in 2006, Hirano received widespread media attention and popularity, which led her to be known as a "super idol" in the voice acting industry. In 2007, she was ranked No. 36 in Daitan Map's Top 50 Voice Actors. She also notably became a voice actor who was able to cross over to mainstream media, where she began appearing on variety shows since 2010. In 2011, Hirano was the 5th best-selling voice actress, making  in total sales.

Beginning in 2010, Hirano drew criticism from her anime  fanbase when she openly discussed her dating and sex life on the variety show Goût Temps Nouveau, as well as the implication that she was abandoning voice acting in favor of a career in mainstream entertainment. In early 2011, an acquaintance of a Lantis employee leaked that Hirano had sexual relations with three of her band members, leading to the dismissal of all four of them; in August 2011, Japanese magazine Bubka published photos of their affair. The incidents have caused several fans to destroy her merchandise, create petitions to remove her from her role in Kizumonogatari, and send death threats. Hirano stopped posting on Twitter beginning on May 18, 2013, allowing her team to use her account as an information channel. In December 2022, Hirano stated on Twitter that she still receives death threats whenever she does voice acting work for anime and cites it as a reason why she has largely stepped away from anime voice acting.

Filmography

Anime

Live-action television series

Drama CDs

Film

Theatre

Dubbing roles
Hirano has had dubbing roles in localized versions of a number of foreign television series and films.

Video games

Discography

Studio albums

Compilation albums

Singles

Character albums and singles

Video albums

References

External links
  
 
 Aya Hirano at Oricon 

1987 births
Living people
Anime singers
Japanese child actresses
Japanese women pop singers
Japanese idols
Japanese musical theatre actresses
Japanese stage actresses
Japanese video game actresses
Japanese voice actresses
Lantis (company) artists
Musicians from Aichi Prefecture
Universal Music Japan artists
Voice actresses from Nagoya
20th-century Japanese actresses
21st-century Japanese actresses
21st-century Japanese women singers
21st-century Japanese singers